Werner Gilles (29 August 1894 – 23 June 1961) was a German artist.

Gilles was born in Rheydt/Rheinland (today Mönchengladbach) He found his artistic calling while at the academies of Kassel and Weimar, studying under Lyonel Feininger of the Bauhaus school. He later moved after 1921 to Ischia, Italy. He moved to Düsseldorf in 1923, but between 1925 and 1930 he also worked in Berlin and Paris and lived in both during the period.

The Nazi regime named him as a degenerate artist from the 1930s, and he had to stop working until after the war. From 1951 he moved to München in the winter, and Ischia in the summer. He died in Essen in 1961.

Major works 
 1933 to 1935 Arthur Rimbaud gewidmet
 1947 to 1949 Orpheus, Akvarellsyklus
 1950 Akvareller til Tibetanischen Totenbuch (the Tibetan book of death)

Exhibitions 
 1948 24th Venice Biennale
 1950 25th Venezia biennial
 1955 documenta 1 in Kassel
 1958 29th Venezia biennial
 1959 documenta II in Kassel
 1961 Kunstverein für die Rheinlande und Westfalen, Düsseldorf
 1962 31st Venezia biennial
 1964 documenta III in Kassel
 1964 Kölnischer Kunstverein, Köln
 1973 Landesmuseum Bonn
 1984 Städtisches Museum, Mülheim an der Ruhr
 2000 Galerie Vömel, Düsseldorf
 2001 Künstler der Galerie Vömel, Düsseldorf
 2002 Galerie Koch, Hannover
 2005/2006 Ein Arkadien der Moderne: Villa Romana Neues Museum Weimar

See also
 List of German painters

External links
 Works by Werner Gilles @ ArtNet.

20th-century German painters
20th-century German male artists
German male painters
Bauhaus alumni
People from Mönchengladbach
1894 births
1961 deaths